Lotta flyttar hemifrån is a Swedish film which was released to cinemas in Sweden on 18 September 1993, directed by Johanna Hald. It's the 2nd film based on the books about Lotta på Bråkmakargatan written by Astrid Lindgren.

Cast
Grete Havnesköld as Lotta
Linn Gloppestad as Mia
Martin Andersson as Jonas
Beatrice Järås as Lotta's mother
Claes Malmberg as Lotta's father
Margreth Weivers as Mrs. Berg
Gunvor Pontén as Mrs. Blomgren
Sten Ljunggren as Mr. Blomgren
Pierre Lindstedt as Kalle Fransson
Johan Rabaeus as truck driver
Renzo Spinetti as Vasilis

References

External links 

Swedish comedy films
1990s Swedish-language films
1993 films
Films based on works by Astrid Lindgren
Swedish sequel films
Films directed by Johanna Hald
Swedish children's films
1990s Swedish films